Kalbe Razi Naqvi (born 1944) is a British Pakistani-Norwegian physicist, who has been ordinarily resident in Norway since 1977, working as a professor of biophysics in the Norwegian University of Science and Technology. He retired at the end of June 2014, and is now a Prof. Emeritus in NTNU.

Education
Born in Rae Bareli, British India in 1944, Naqvi received his school and university education in Karachi, and moved to the United Kingdom in 1964, when the University of Manchester awarded him a research scholarship. He joined the molecular physics group, and obtained his Ph.D in 1968 for a thesis entitled “Delayed light emission from organic molecules in solution”.  The Royal Society of London appointed him to a Rutherford Scholarship for the period 1968–71 to continue his work on the behaviour of the excited states of molecules. In 1969, he moved to the Department of Chemistry, University of Sheffield, where he stayed for five years.

Razi Naqvi kinetic law

After his formative years in Manchester, Naqvi’s interest widened considerably. He investigated, in addition to photoluminescence of organic molecules, the photophysics of saturable absorbers (cryptocyanine and related dyes, then used for passive Q-switching of ruby lasers), and used their nonlinear behaviour for determining the subnanosecond lifetimes of their first excited singlet states. In 1973, he became interested in developing biophysical applications of spectroscopy, and used triplet probes to develop what had until then been among the desiderata of membrane research, optical methods for monitoring the translational and rotational mobility of membrane components. His theoretical analysis of diffusion-controlled reactions in lipid membranes led to the remarkable conclusion that in the two-dimensional case, one cannot speak of a rate constant. More than two decades later, his prediction was verified, and his expression for the rate parameter of a two-dimensional diffusion-controlled reaction was named as the Razi Naqvi kinetic law.

Research in chemical physics

Naqvi became a naturalized British citizen in 1974, but left Sheffield for the Physical Chemistry Laboratory, Swiss Federal Institute of Technology (ETH) in Zurich. In 1976, he reported the first example of a comparatively rare phenomenon: electronic energy transfer, mediated by electron exchange, from a triplet donor to a double acceptor; in his experiments, the donor was the benzophenone triplet and the acceptor was the benzophenone ketyl radical.

Research in biophysics

Since moving to Trondheim in 1977, Naqvi has worked on a wide range of problems within physics, chemistry and biology, dividing his time equally between theory and experiment and between the pure and the applied. These topics include: (1) calculation of Franck–Condon factors, (2) applications of linear transport theory to chemical kinetics, diffuse reflection spectroscopy, and phonon transport in semiconductors, (3) spectroscopy of absorbing and scattering specimens, (4) primary photophysical processes in carotenoids, vitamin E and related molecules, (5) revival of quantum wave packets, (6) photoprotection in artificial and natural photosynthesis, (7) use of diffusive gradient in thin films (DGTF) for the in situ measurement of the labile forms of chemical elements in aqueous environments, sediments and soils, and (8) non-invasive measurement of blood pressure.

Naqvi’s many coauthors include a very large number of scientists from all over the world. Within NTNU, his collaborators include, apart from many physicists, several chemists (analytical, organic, physical) and two mathematicians. In addition to his steady research output, Naqvi has manifested his commitment to teaching by contributing to journals devoted to didactical aspects of science (American Journal of Physics, European Journal of Physics, Journal of Chemical Education).

Other academic interests

Naqvi has also been interested in the history of ideas, public and private support of scientific research, and the role of the peer-review process in the dissemination of scientific information; in teaching mathematics and statistics to those whose talents lie elsewhere; and in promoting the acceptance of biological evolution in societies opposed to it on the basis of a literal interpretation of sacred texts. In 2015, he published a book entitled “Can Science Come Back to Islam?” and more recently “Calculus Without Hocus Pocus”.

External links

1944 births
Living people
Muhajir people
Pakistani physicists
English physicists
Pakistani emigrants to the United Kingdom
Naturalised citizens of the United Kingdom
Academic staff of the Norwegian Institute of Technology
Academic staff of the Norwegian University of Science and Technology
English people of Pakistani descent
Pakistani emigrants to Norway
Pakistani expatriates in Norway
People from Karachi
British expatriates in Norway
University of Karachi alumni
British academics of Pakistani descent